Charles Crompton Q.C. (4 February 1833 – 25 June 1890) was an English barrister and  Liberal politician.

Life
Crompton was born at St Pancras, London, the son of  Sir Charles Crompton, a Judge of the Queen's Bench and his wife Caroline Fletcher of Liverpool. He was educated at University College School, University College, London, and at Trinity College, Cambridge (4th Wrangler 1855, MA 1858). He was a Fellow of the college in 1856 and was called to the bar at Inner Temple in 1864. Crompton stood unsuccessfully for parliament at West Cheshire in the 1874 general election. He was a member of the commission to investigate alleged corrupt practices at Knaresborough in 1880. and became a Q.C. in 1882.

At the 1885 general election, Crompton was elected Member of Parliament (MP) for Leek in Staffordshire. He lost the seat at the 1886 general election, and did not stand again.

Crompton lived at Manchester and died at the age of 57.

Crompton married Florence Elizabeth Gaskell, daughter of Elizabeth Gaskell, in 1863.

References

External links 

1833 births
1890 deaths
Alumni of University College London
Alumni of Trinity College, Cambridge
Liberal Party (UK) MPs for English constituencies
UK MPs 1885–1886
Members of the Inner Temple
People educated at University College School